La Conner is a town in Skagit County, Washington, United States with a population of 965 at the 2020 census. It is included in the Mount Vernon–Anacortes, Washington Metropolitan Statistical Area. The town hosts several events as part of the annual Skagit Valley Tulip Festival held in April.

History

La Conner was first settled in May 1867 by Alonzo Low and was then known by its post office name, Swinomish. Its location on the Swinomish channel was an ideal safe harbor for ships. In 1869, J.S. Conner bought the settlement's trading post and in 1870 had the name changed to honor his wife, Louisa Ann Conner. The French-appearing "La" represented her first and middle initials. When Skagit County was created out of Whatcom County in 1883, La Conner was chosen as the county seat, but would only hold that designation until November 1884 when the seat was moved to Mount Vernon.

In early 2020, nine businesses in downtown La Conner announced their closures—mostly attributed to lost revenue during the COVID-19 pandemic and from the cancellation of the Skagit Valley Tulip Festival.

Geography

La Conner is located along the Swinomish Channel, across from the Swinomish Indian Reservation on Fidalgo Island, in western Skagit County. The Rainbow Bridge, a steel arch bridge, connects La Conner to the Swinomish Indian Reservation. The town is north of Skagit Bay and is connected to nearby highways by local roads. The center of town, known as "the Hill", roughly bounded by Second, Morris and Commercial streets and the Swinomish Channel, is a historic district and is listed on the National Register of Historic Places.

Economy

La Conner is located at the edge of the Skagit Valley, the largest tulip-growing region in the world and host of an annual tulip festival in April. Other crops grown in the area include strawberries and wheat.

Demographics

As of 2000 the median income for a household in the town was $42,344, and the median income for a family was $52,083. Males had a median income of $40,074 versus $26,875 for females. The per capita income for the town was $24,308. About 8.8% of families and 11.8% of the population were below the poverty line, including 20.3% of those under age 18 and 8.1% of those age 65 or over.

2010 census
As of the census of 2010, there were 891 people, 467 households, and 224 families residing in the town. The racial makeup of the town was 87.1% White, 0.7% African American, 5.1% Native American, 1.0% Asian, 3.4% from other races, and 2.8% from two or more races. Hispanic or Latino of any race were 6.2% of the population.

There were 467 households, of which 18.0% had children under the age of 18 living with them, 36.6% were married couples living together, 8.8% had a female householder with no husband present, 2.6% had a male householder with no wife present, and 52.0% were non-families. Of all households 45.8% were made up of individuals, and 24.9% had someone living alone who was 65 years of age or older. The average household size was 1.91 and the average family size was 2.70.

The median age in the town was 52.8 years. Of all residents 16.8% were under the age of 18; 4.3% were between the ages of 18 and 24; 18.3% were from 25 to 44; 34.5% were from 45 to 64; and 26.2% were 65 years of age or older. The gender makeup of the town was 45.1% male and 54.9% female.

Landmarks

La Conner's Rainbow bridge connects La Conner to Fidalgo Island, which includes the gated Shelter Bay Community, the Swinomish reservation, and the city of Anacortes. The center of town—roughly bounded by 2nd, Morris, and Commercial streets and Swinomish Channel—is a historic district, listed on the National Register of Historic Places (NRHP). Also on the NRHP is the Bethsaida Swedish Evangelical Lutheran Church Parsonage east of town.

Notable residents

Author Tom Robbins is a long-time resident of La Conner. Many of his books, most notably Another Roadside Attraction, have chapters set in the vicinity.

Pacific Northwest photographer Art Hupy (1924–2003) settled in La Conner in 1977 and founded the Museum of Northwest Art in 1981. Many influential Northwest artists including Guy Anderson, Clayton James, and Barbara Straker James have close ties to La Conner.

Radical labor activist Hulet M. Wells (1878–1970), a 1912 Socialist candidate for mayor of Seattle, president of the Seattle Central Labor Council, and founder in 1931 of the Unemployed Citizens' League of Seattle was born in a cabin near La Conner, where his Canadian-born parents homesteaded in 1877. Jailed at McNeil Island Penitentiary for his opposition to World War I, Wells was one of the leading public faces of Washington radicalism during the first decades of the 20th century.

Joe Shell (born in La Conner in 1918) is a former member and floor leader of the California State Assembly and was the intraparty opponent of Richard M. Nixon for the California Republican gubernatorial nomination in 1962. His father was an Indian agent at the time on the Swinomish Reservation.

In addition to these, there is also Brian Cladoosby. He has been the Chairman of the Swinomish Indian Senate from 1997 onward. In 2013 he was elected to be the (21st) President of the National Congress of American Indians and still serves today, as well as being the President of the Association of Washington Tribes.

Arts and culture

The Museum of Northwest Art showcases a permanent collection of northwest artists and revolving shows throughout the year. The town is also home to the Skagit Historical Museum, with perhaps the best view in town, and the Quilt Museum, located in one of the oldest homes in town, the Gaches Mansion.

The town of La Conner is home to several fine art galleries, including La Conner Seaside Gallery, Forum Arts, Earthenworks, and Alek's Art Studio. Visual artists, painters, and photographers have also worked from spaces in and around La Conner, including Northwest School members Guy Anderson, Morris Graves, and Richard Gilkey. Fishtown, an informal artists' community housed in a cluster of old cabins and fishing shacks on the north fork of the Skagit River delta, housed many artists from the late 1960s to the mid-1980s.

Also famous for its many feral domestic turkeys, the town named the turkey as their "Official Town Bird in 2005". On August 8, 2006; however, a debate was heard in town council about whether the birds should be removed because of nuisance complaints about noise, fecal matter, and ingestion of garden materials.  As of October 2010, the town council declared the turkeys to be a nuisance and has since taken action to have them removed from the town limits.

La Conner's public library, which is run by the town government and serves residents of the local school district, opened on November 26, 1993, at a former storefront. Plans to construct a permanent library were announced in 2012 with a ten-year fundraising campaign. Construction on the new library began in October 2021 and was completed the following year at a cost of $5 million. The  building opened on October 18, 2022, and includes community spaces, a rooftop solar array, and signage in English, Spanish, Braille, and Lushootseed.

Sister cities
La Conner has the following sister cities.
  White Rock, BC, Canada
  Kenmare, Ireland
  Olga, Russia
  San Rafael del Sur, Nicaragua

References

External links

 Town of La Conner
 Swinomish Indian Tribal Community

National Register of Historic Places in Skagit County, Washington
Historic districts on the National Register of Historic Places in Washington (state)
Towns in Skagit County, Washington
Towns in Washington (state)